Heiligenthal may refer to:

 Heiligenthal, Saxony-Anhalt, a village in Saxony-Anhalt
 Heiligenthal (Südergellersen), a village in Lower Saxony